Mighty Fine is a 2012 American comedy-drama film written and directed by Debbie Goodstein-Rosenfeld, starring Chazz Palminteri, Andie MacDowell, Jodelle Ferland, and Rainey Qualley. It was given a limited theatrical release in the United States on May 25, 2012, by Adopt Films.

Synopsis
In 1974, Joe Fine, a Jewish-American businessman from Brooklyn, New York, moves his wife Stella and his two daughters, Natalie and Maddie to New Orleans, Louisiana, where he has relocated his textile factory, in order to try to save it due to the decline of the textile industry.  The cost of living is lower in the South and he can avoid travel, but he proceeds to live beyond his means including  large extravagances. When a big investor decides to pull out of the deal, he takes a loan from the local mob. Joe has always suffered from anger management issues, but now stress is leading to depression and emotionally lashing out at his wife and daughters. He sees a psychologist upon his wife's urging, but he assures him that he is fine and his wife must be unduly concerned, because she is a Holocaust survivor. However, after he attempts to commit suicide, his wife pushes the panic button that Joe himself had installed, the police come and send him to a psychiatric hospital to deal with his anxiety disorder. Meanwhile, his younger daughter Natalie, who is the narrator of the story and suffers from a fear of public speaking, slowly learns to move on, and wins a US$500-poetry competition sponsored by the Campbell Soup Company. Eventually, she sees her father again when he has recovered from stress.

Cast

Critical reception
The film received a rating of 18% on Rotten Tomatoes. The Hollywood Reporter gave a scathing review, suggesting it stood "a slim chance of carving out much of a niche from an anticipated Memorial Day weekend limited release." The Los Angeles Times published a similarly bad review, commenting that Andie McDowell seemed "so constricted by her awkward Polish accent and timid persona that she tends to disappear in front of us." Stephen Holden of The New York Times gave the film a positive review, writing, calling it an "incisive portrait of an insecure, manic-depressive tyrant that Mr. Palminteri makes entirely believable." Kyle Smith of the New York Post also gave the film a positive review, writing that it "has some quiet charms." The film also won best in show (first place) in Toronto's Female Eye Film Festival.

References

External links
 
 

2012 films
2012 comedy-drama films
2012 independent films
2010s English-language films
American comedy-drama films
American independent films
Films about dysfunctional families
Films about Jews and Judaism
Films set in 1974
Films set in New Orleans
Films shot in New Orleans
2010s American films